National Bird is a 2016 American-German documentary film directed and produced by Sonia Kennebeck. Wim Wenders and Errol Morris serve as executive producers.

The film had its world premiere at the Berlin International Film Festival on February 11, 2016. It was released in the United States on November 11, 2016, by FilmRise.

Synopsis
The film focuses on three whistleblowers who talk about unmanned aerial vehicles commonly called drones.

Release
The film had its world premiere at the Berlin International Film Festival on February 14, 2016. Shortly after, FilmRise acquired U.S. distribution rights to the film. It also screened at the Tribeca Film Festival on April 16, 2016. The film was released in the United States on November 11, 2016. It was broadcast on Independent Lens on May 1, 2017.

Reception

Critical reception
National Bird received positive reviews from film critics. It holds a 100% approval rating on review aggregator website Rotten Tomatoes, based on 22 reviews, with a weighted average of 8.30/10.  On Metacritic, the film holds a rating of 75 out of 100, based on 11 critics, indicating "generally favorable reviews".

Peter Debruge of Variety gave the film a positive review writing: "Chilling testimony from those three veterans, each of whom helped to wage war from behind consoles half a world away, serves as the backbone of a film that adds its voice to mounting criticism of the U.S. drone program." Alex Needham of The Guardian gave the film four out of five stars writing: "With stealth and elegance, Kennebeck brings these alarming truths into the light."

See also
 List of films featuring drones

References

External links

National Bird | Drone Warfare Whistleblowers | Independent Lens | PBS National Bird] at Independent Lens

2016 documentary films
2010s war films
2016 films
American documentary films
German documentary films
Documentary films about military aviation
Documentary films about politics
Documentary films about terrorism
Documentary films about war
Drone films
Films about security and surveillance
Films about whistleblowing
2010s English-language films
2010s American films
2010s German films
English-language documentary films